Discus guerinianus is a species of small air-breathing land snail, a terrestrial gastropod mollusk in the family Discidae, the disk snails.

Distribution
This species is endemic to Madeira, Portugal.

Shell description
The shell of these snails is shaped like a discus, or a lens, with a noticeable "edge" around the periphery of the whorls.

Conservation status
This species is mentioned in annexes IV and IV of the Habitats Directive.

References

Discidae
Taxa named by Richard Thomas Lowe
Gastropods described in 1852

Endemic fauna of Madeira
Molluscs of Madeira
Taxobox binomials not recognized by IUCN